The Newcomb Power Football Netball Club is an Australian rules football and netball club based in the suburb of Moolap, Victoria. The teams currently play in the Bellarine Football League.

Newcomb Power's home ground is Grinter Reserve, Moolap.

History 
The club was established in 1975 as "Newcomb Football Club" until 2000 when a name change it became the "Newcomb Power Football Club". Originally nicknamed the Dinosaurs, the club is now known as the Power. 

Originally the club wore a maroon guernsey with light blue yolk and distinctive light blue shorts with maroon stripes. A dinosaur badge with yellow 'stegasauraus' was worn left of the jumper, the badge also adorned the caps of the Newcomb and District Cricket Club. The football club officially came under the banner of Newcomb and District Sports Club however as the club lost its lacrosse, baseball and tennis clubs to name a few and today the Power are known as Newcomb Football Club.  

Newcomb have won (1) Reserves Premiership being 1980, (8) U/18's Flags 1978, 81–84, 86, 90-91 four being as Champions (undefeated) and Grand Finalists in 2015, U/15's won (5) Flags 1978–80, 82, 84 four as Champions.

Premierships

Senior 
 Bellarine Football League (6): 1980, 1981, 1982, 1988, 2005, 2007

Reserves 
 Bellarine Football League (1): 1980

Colts 
 Bellarine Football League (8): 1978, 1981 (Under 17s); 1982, 1983, 1984, 1986, 1990, 1991 (Under 18s)

Junior 
 Bellarine Football League (5): 1978, 1979 (Under 14s); 1980, 1982, 1984 (Under 15s)

Individual honours 
 BFL Senior Best and Fairest (Les Ash Medal):
 1981 – John Fagan
 1996 – Paul Hudson
 1997 – Paul Hudson
 2007 – Ricky O'Toole

 BFL Reserves Best and Fairest (Don Cole Medal):
 1979 – David Wilson
 1981 – Alan McKee
 1982 – Terry Bellears
 1991 – Chris Nicholls
 1998 – Craig Pearce
 1999 – Stephen Ward
 2001 – Craig Pearce

 Senior Leading Goalkicker:
 1979 — Tony Sudale (85)
 1981 — Tony Sudale (77)

 Reserves Leading Goalkicker:
 1979 – Steven Turner (97)
 1980 – Steven Turner (74)
 1981 – Des Harris (47)
 1999 – Paul Vigilante (69)

Notable VFL/AFL players 
David O'Keeffe with Geelong and Brisbane Bears

Bibliography
 Cat Country: History of Football in the Geelong Region by John Stoward – Aussie Footy Books, 2008

External links
 Twitter page
 Team app

Bellarine Football League
Australian rules football clubs in Geelong
Sports clubs established in 1975
Australian rules football clubs established in 1975
1975 establishments in Australia
Netball teams in Geelong